Zoran Čampara (born 16 February 1972 in Mostar) is a Bosnian Serb retired football player.

During his playing career he played for NK Iskra Bugojno, FK Velez Mostar, FK Rad, UE Lleida, Royal Antwerp FC, Shandong Luneng, Beitar Jerusalem F.C. and Royal Francs Borains.

He was also an Athletic Supervisor and Sports Director in his former club FK Rad from 2008 until March 2011.

References

External sources
 Profile at Royal Antwerp official site.

Living people
1972 births
Sportspeople from Mostar
Serbian footballers
Serbs of Bosnia and Herzegovina
FK Velež Mostar players
FK Rad players
First League of Serbia and Montenegro players
UE Lleida players
Expatriate footballers in Spain
Royal Antwerp F.C. players
Belgian Pro League players
Bosnia and Herzegovina expatriate sportspeople in China
Expatriate footballers in Belgium
Shandong Taishan F.C. players
Expatriate footballers in China
Serbian expatriate sportspeople in Israel
Beitar Jerusalem F.C. players
Expatriate footballers in Israel
Association football defenders
Serbian expatriate sportspeople in China
Serbian expatriate sportspeople in Spain
Serbian expatriate sportspeople in Belgium
Francs Borains players